The following is an overview of the various characters that were secondary (therefore, recurring) to the main characters in the animated Super Friends series.

Batman supporting characters

Commissioner James Gordon
Gordon makes two appearances in Super Friends. He first appeared in Challenge of the Super Friends, episode "Super Friends, Rest in Peace" voiced by Danny Dark. Riddler and Cheetah hold Gordon hostage so they can kill Batman with the Noxium Crystal.

The second is in The Super Powers Team: Galactic Guardians, episode "The Fear". Along with Jonathan Crane, Gordon is trying to find and arrest The Scarecrow. Gordon and Batman are both unaware that Crane is the Scarecrow.

He also appeared in some of the comics related to the show.

Alfred Pennyworth
William Callaway voice-played Alfred in Challenge of the Super Friends, while presumably another voice actor provided his voice in The Super Powers Team: Galactic Guardians episode "The Fear".

Flash supporting characters

Solovar
Solovar first appeared in the Challenge of the Super Friends episode "Revenge on Gorilla City" voiced by Michael Rye.

Green Lantern (Hal Jordan) supporting characters

Abin Sur
Abin Sur first appeared in the Challenge of the Super Friends episode "Secret Origins of the Super Friends" voiced by Dick Ryal.

Superman supporting characters

Lois Lane
Lois Lane has also made some appearances in the Super Friends series. Lois makes an appearance in "Super Friends, Rest in Peace" from the Challenge of the Super Friends season. In The World's Greatest Super Friends season, Lois appears in the episode "Lex Luthor Strikes Back". She appeared on the 1980s episode "The Ice Demon". Lois also makes two cameo appearances in the Super Friends: The Legendary Super Powers Show season in the cartoons "The Bride of Darkseid" and "Reflections in Crime".

Jimmy Olsen
In the Super Friends animated series, he "appears" in the second episode of The World's Greatest Super Friends season, 'Lex Luthor Strikes Back', with Lois Lane. However, it turned out it wasn't Jimmy at all, but Lex Luthor's henchman Orville Gump in disguise.

Perry White
Perry appears in Super Friends, in the episode "Superriends, Rest In Peace" of Challenge of the Super Friends, when Superman tries to rescue him and Lois Lane from Lex Luthor and Solomon Grundy.

Wonder Woman supporting characters

Queen Hippolyta
In 1978, an animated Queen Hippolyta was shown in the Challenge of the Super Friends episodes Secret Origins of the Super Friends and Super Friends: Rest in Peace. In 1980, Queen Hippolyta (blonde hair) appeared in the Super Friends episode "Return of Atlantis". In that episode, Wonder Woman addresses Hippolyta by name rather than "Mother" like in the live action television series which was no longer in production.

Steve Trevor
In Super Friends, he is mentioned in Super Friends: The Legendary Super Powers Show in the episode "Darkseid's Golden Trap, Part 2", when Wonder Woman announces: "I have a date with Steve Trevor tonight...which dress should I wear?" He is also seen in the episode "Mr. Mxyzptlk and the Magic Lamp," although only a brief cameo, he has no dialogue. He later appears in an episode of The Super Powers Team: Galactic Guardians, where he is revealed to be an astronaut. That episode was called "The Darkseid Deception."

Other characters

Colonel Wilcox
Colonel Wilcox, a U.S. Army official, was a recurring character in the first season who would work as a government liaison to the Super Friends during emergencies.

References

Super Friends supporting characters
Supporting characters
Supporting charaacters